Ros Martin (born 1960s) is a British playwright, poet, performance artist, curator and activist, based in Bristol. She is a founder member of the Bristol Black Women's Writers Group (2002–2005) and "Our Stories Make Waves" (OSMW) and Speakeasy South West, the latter two both associations of African diaspora artists in creativity.

Biography
Born in London, England, Ros Martin is second-generation British, her parents being from Nigeria and Saint Lucia. Her great-uncle was pioneering Yoruba Nigerian film and stage actor Orlando Martins (1899–1985), and she has been researching and developing material in connection with his life.

She is the artistic director of the Daughters of Igbo Woman Project, "a transnational digital installation comprising a trilogy of literary films made in (UK, Nigeria & Nevis respectively)".

Publications in which her writings appear include Marginalia (Volume 2 of Jerwood/Arvon Mentoring Scheme anthology) No Condition is Permanent, 19 Poets on Climate Justice and Change (Platform, 2010), and the 2019 anthology New Daughters of Africa, edited by Margaret Busby.

Martin has been a driving force behind the "Countering Colston" campaign group, an anti-racist, pro-equity collective working to decolonise Bristol, including addressing ways in which the city has for centuries honoured Edward Colston, who was a slave trading merchant in the 17th century. Among initiatives for which she campaigned was the renaming of Colston Hall (now Bristol Beacon), which came about in September 2020.

On 25 January 2021, Martin was one of four protesters arrested by the police for peacefully demonstrating outside Bristol magistrates court in support of the "Colston Four", the three men and a woman accused – and cleared at trial – of toppling the statue of Edward Colston during the 2020 Black Lives Matter protests. Martin had chalked the words "Let Justice Prevail" on the pavement outside the steps of the court. Avon and Somerset Police subsequently apologised for the protest ban, accepting that they had misinterpreted the regulations and that the arrests were unlawful.

Martin is the author of the 2022 book Before I Am Rendered Invisible – Resistance From The Margins, a volume of spoken word, social commentary, play, essay and memoir that "throws a harrowing spotlight on issues behind racial inequality". She has said: Before I Am Rendered Invisible' is a personal archive of performance writings that chart black struggle and resistance in Bristol and beyond, in spoken word, play, public chalk events, social commentary and memoir. In 'Before I Am Rendered Invisible', I am remembering, I am giving space, affording time, giving voice to the little people’s lives, to events that have mattered to me, that have provoked me, whilst living and working in Bristol. I am countering the silence, bringing to the fore and celebrating marginalised lives of struggle and resistance."

Selected works 
 2013: Return of the Vanishing Peasant (stage play), with Denise Ferreira da Silva
 2016: Being Rendered Visible in the Georgian House Museum, Bristol

References

External links 
 Olawale Arts – Ros Martin website.
 "Remembrance, Legacy, and the Transatlantic Slave Trade – Ros Martin", International Research Partnerships, University of Bristol, 21 July 2014.

21st-century British poets
21st-century British women writers
Black British activists
Black British women writers
British people of Nigerian descent
British people of Saint Lucian descent
British women dramatists and playwrights
English dramatists and playwrights
English people of Yoruba descent
English women poets
Writers from London
1960s births
Living people